Girls of Today is a 1955 Italian comedy film directed by Luigi Zampa and starring Marisa Allasio.

Cast
Marisa Allasio as Anna Bardellotti 
Lili Cerasoli as Sofia Bardellotti 
Paolo Stoppa as Giuseppe Bardellotti
Edoardo Bergamo as Mongardi jr.
Armenia Balducci as Tilde Bardellotti 
Paola Quattrini as  Simonetta Bardellotti 
Françoise Rosay as Innkeeper
Louis Seigner as  Mongardi 
Frank Villard as  Armando 
Mike Bongiorno as  Sandro 
Camillo Milli as Dr. Vannucci
Bella Billa as Matilde   
Ada Colangeli as  Filomena
Antonio Acqua as Antiquarian
Ugo Sasso as  Juror
Enzo Garinei as  Juror
Guido Celano
Valeria Fabrizi

External links

1955 films
1955 comedy films
1950s Italian-language films
Italian comedy films
Italian black-and-white films
Films directed by Luigi Zampa
Films scored by Carlo Savina
Films set in Milan
Films shot in Milan
1950s Italian films